Odontorhabdus is a genus of longhorn beetles of the subfamily Lamiinae, containing the following species:

 Odontorhabdus dentipes Aurivillius, 1928
 Odontorhabdus flavicornis Aurivillius, 1928
 Odontorhabdus rechingeri Aurivillius, 1913
 Odontorhabdus teretiscapus Aurivillius, 1928

References

Cyrtinini